Trite caledoniensis is a jumping spider species in the genus Trite. The male was first identified in 2014 by Barbara Maria Patoleta.

Distribution
Trite caledoniensis is found in New Caledonia, from which the species name is derived.

References

Spiders of New Caledonia
Salticidae
Spiders described in 2014